Joseph Alfred Johnson (4 April 1911 – 8 August 1983) was an English footballer who played in the Football League for Bristol City, Stoke City and West Bromwich Albion as well as the England national team.

Club career
Johnson was born in Grimsby and began working as a fishmonger whilst playing amateur football with Cleethorpes Royal Saints and then Scunthorpe & Lindsey United before being spotted by Second Division Bristol City in July 1929. He broke into the side in making his debut in the 1931–32 season. Bristol City were having a terrible campaign winning just three of their first 32 games before the club fell into severe financial difficulties and put their entire squad up for sale. Stoke City visited Ashton Gate on 16 April 1932 and the Bristol directors desperate for funds told the Stoke board they could buy whoever they wanted. Manager Tom Mather singled out their young left winger Johnson and signed him for a mere £250.

Johnson quickly took the place of the ageing Bobby Archibald and soon made an impression with the pace running up and down the left wing. With Stanley Matthews on the right wing Stoke had one of the best pairing of wingers in the country and he scored 15 times in 43 games in 1932–33 as Stoke won the Second Division title. He remained a key player in Stoke's forward line for the next four seasons and earned international recognition. He suffered an ankle injury on the opening day of the 1937–38 season and Stoke manager Bob McGrory decided to sell him to West Bromwich Albion for a fee of  £6,500.

Johnson spent nine years with the Baggies and during World War II he guested for Crewe Alexandra, Leicester City and Notts County. After the war he played for Northwich Victoria and Hereford United and later ran a refreshment area close to the Hawthorns. He died in West Bromwich in August 1983 at the age of 72.

International career
Johnson made his England debut against Ireland at Stoke's Victoria Ground. He went on to earn caps against Scotland, Norway, Sweden and Finland. He scored his two goals in the games against Sweden and Finland.

Career statistics

Club
Source:

International
Source:

References

1911 births
1983 deaths
English footballers
England international footballers
Stoke City F.C. players
Bristol City F.C. players
West Bromwich Albion F.C. players
Scunthorpe United F.C. players
Northwich Victoria F.C. players
Hereford United F.C. players
English Football League players
Footballers from Grimsby
Association football outside forwards